Jim Pugh (born February 5, 1964) is a former professional tennis player from the United States. He grew up in Palos Verdes, California and at age 10 began taking tennis lessons from John Hillebrand. He played tennis at UCLA.  He became a doubles specialist on the ATP Tour and won three Grand Slam men's doubles titles (two Australian Open, one Wimbledon) and five Grand Slam mixed doubles titles (three Australian Open, one Wimbledon, one US Open). Pugh reached the world No. 1 doubles ranking in 1989.

Career
Pugh was a member of the U.S. team that won the Davis Cup in 1990.  Partnering with Rick Leach, he won the doubles rubbers in all four of the rounds which the U.S. played in that year and clinched the team's victory in the final with a win over Pat Cash and John Fitzgerald of Australia.  Pugh has a 6–0 career record in Davis Cup play.

Pugh won 27 doubles titles (22 men's doubles and 5 mixed doubles). He also won one top-level singles title at Newport, Rhode Island in 1989, reaching a career-high singles ranking of world No. 37 in 1987. Pugh won his last career doubles title at Los Angeles in 1992. 
Pugh was inducted into the Intercollegiate Tennis Association (ITA) Hall of Fame in 2008.

ATP career finals

Singles: 4 (1 title, 3 runner-ups)

Doubles: 37 (22 titles, 15 runner-ups)

ATP Challenger and ITF Futures finals

Singles: 2 (0–2)

Doubles: 6 (4–2)

Performance timelines

Singles

Doubles

Mixed doubles

References

External links 
 
 
 

American male tennis players
Australian Open (tennis) champions
Sportspeople from Burbank, California
Sportspeople from Manhattan Beach, California

Tennis people from California
UCLA Bruins men's tennis players
US Open (tennis) champions
Wimbledon champions
1964 births
Living people
Grand Slam (tennis) champions in mixed doubles
Grand Slam (tennis) champions in men's doubles
ATP number 1 ranked doubles tennis players